The 1993–94 Kent Football League season was the 28th in the history of the Kent Football League, a football competition in England.

The league was won by Herne Bay for the second time, while Alma Swanley resigned from the league at the end of the season and folded.

League table

The league featured 20 clubs which competed in the previous season, along with one new club:
Dartford, resigned from the Southern League

Also, Danson Furness United changed name to Furness.

League table

References

External links

1993-94
1993–94 in English football leagues